ROH Supercard of Honor is a pay-per-view professional wrestling event annually presented by the U.S. based promotion Ring of Honor (ROH), and primarily takes place during the weekend of WrestleMania - the flagship event of WWE and considered to be the biggest wrestling event of the year. 

Supercard of Honor has been a yearly tradition since 2006. The shows are sometimes two-day events, traditionally taking place on Friday nights and/or Saturday afternoons, and are held either in or nearby the same city as that year's WrestleMania. The only deviations so far have been the 2010 and 2011 Supercards, which were held about a month after WrestleMania weekend. The 2019 event used the modified "G1 Supercard" name as it was co-produced with New Japan Pro-Wrestling.

After annually running from 2006-2019 (with the exception of 2012), the event took a two year hiatus, as Supercard of Honor XIV had been scheduled to take place on April 4, 2020 with some matches having already been announced, but was cancelled due to the COVID-19 pandemic, and no Supercard of Honor event took place in 2021 because of the lingering pandemic.  The event returned in 2022 with Supercard of Honor XV.

Dates and venues

See also
ROH annual events

References

External links
Ring of Honor's official website